Julio Pelegrin Milostich Muñoz (born October 5, 1966) is a Chilean theater, film and television actor.

The cynical and morally antagonistic style of many of Milostich's characters and his condition as an unconventional heartthrob are some of the most memorable outstanding traits. Among his most remembered roles are his portrayal of General Bernardo O'Higgins in Héroes and as José Luis Echeñique, the protagonist of El Señor de la Querencia for which he won many awards.

Career 

Milostich was born in Punta Arenas on October 5, 1966. His father died quite young, so his mother, Magdalena Muñoz, took care of her family, made up of 5 siblings. He studied basic education at the E-20 school and continued his studies at the Liceo Salesiano San José, in Punta Arenas. Driven by the priests, in 1986 he emigrated to Santiago to study at the DRAN School of Dramatic Art

Milostich's first audition for a play was in 1988, to work on La batuta. Together with the actor and director Mateo Iribarren, he made a version of The Little Prince. Shortly afterwards, Milostich was invited to participate in Chronicle of a Death Foretold, where he met Alejandro Trejo, one of his great friends to this day, and whom he considers as his mentor. Together with him they formed the company La comarca.

Milostich's first television incursion was on TVN's Mea culpa, under the direction of Carlos Pinto.

In 2004 Milostich began to work on Channel 13, his first role in a television series being Manuel Doren for Hippie, where he arrived because the casting director of Channel 13 saw him acting in the play The Dark Shared Flight. Then he has been the permanent face of the television series of the first semester of Channel 13 in productions such as Brujas (2005), Descarado (2006), and Papi Ricky (2007).

However, Milostich's great leap came in 2007, when he played Bernardo O'Higgins in the miniseries Héroes de Canal 13, for which he was nominated for the Altazor Award in 2009. Director Ricardo Larraín, who was in charge of the project on Bernardo O'Higgins, says that he chose Milostich because of his physical resemblance to the hero. Milostich's performance of O'Higgins was considered masterful. 

Thanks to Milostich's performance in the telefilm, the director María Eugenia Rencoret noticed him and signed him for two years for the drama area of TVN. During 2008 he participated in the nightly telenovela of the same television station, El Señor de la Querencia, where he played José Luis Echeñique, the owner of La Querencia and the telenovela's main antagonist. Although Milostich said that, "Playing the bad guy is a great challenge," he also claimed to be happy with his latest performance on television. Despite this, the stress and pressure of the character would eventually lead him to ask for a few weeks off on two occasions. Sigrid Alegría (Leonor in El Señor de La Querencia), declared that "after a very powerful year for him, a year with a character who taught him to know a threshold of emotions that was too high [...] Julio Milostich reached a limit". His deteriorating mental health and some legal problems kept him away from television for a while.

Milostich finally returned to the stage in 2009 with the play El hombre de La Mancha at the Municipal Theater of Santiago, where together with the participation of Amaya Forch and the tenor Daniel Farias, he would interpret the idealist "Don Quixote". That same year he would participate as part of the cast of actors in the electoral strip for the presidential elections for the campaign of candidate Jorge Arrate. The work would be put on the billboard again in the same venue during the summer of 2010, within the framework of the Santiago a Mil Festival.
He returned to Channel 13 in 2010 acting in the TV series Primera dama and in 2014 in the drama Secretos en el Jardín. 

In 2014, Milostich played Rodrigo Pérez de Uriondo, a Spanish captain who arrived at the Villarrica fort during the Arauco war between the Spanish and the Mapuches in the series Sitiados directed by Nicolás Acuña. He was accompanied among others in the cast such as Andrés Parra, Marimar Vega and Benjamín Vicuña. The series was released on Fox and on TVN, that year.

In 2019 Milostich starred in the drama Río Oscuro alongside Claudia Di Girolamo and Amparo Noguera on Channel 13. In the same year, he appeared on Gemelas de Chilevisión.

Filmography

Film

Telenovelas 
{| class="wikitable"
! Year
! Telenovela 
! Character
! Channel
|-
| 2004
| Hippie
| Manuel Doren
| rowspan="4" |Canal 13
|-
| 2005
| Brujas
| Fabián Mainardi
|-
| 2006
| Descarado
| Marco Antonio Ferrada
|-
| 2007
| Papi Ricky
| Renato del Río
|-
|rowspan="2" | 2008
| Viuda Alegre
| Alfonso Correa
| rowspan="3" |TVN
|-
| El Señor de la Querencia
| José Luis Echeñique
|-
| 2009–2010
| Conde Vrolok
| Fraile Faustino Rengifo
|-
| 2010
| Primera Dama
| Leonardo Santander
| rowspan="3" |Canal 13
|-
| 2013
| Las Vega's
| Álvaro Sandoval
|-
| 2013–2014
| Secretos en el jardín
| Francisco O'Ryan 
|-
| 2016
| Señores papis
| Eduardo Bachi (Lalo)
| rowspan="2" | Mega
|-
| 2017
| Verdades ocultas
| Pedro Mackenna
|-
| 2019–2020
| Gemelas
| Manuel Vázquez de Acuña
| Chilevision
|-
| 2019
| [[Río Oscuro|Río oscuro]] 
| Juan Echeverría 
| Canal 13
|}

 TV Series 

 Theatre 
 Crónica de una muerte anunciadaGalileo Galilei  La comarca del jazmín La marejada Fantasmas borrachos La zapatera prodigiosaProvincia Kapital (2004)
 El loco afán El desvarío El hombre de La Mancha (2009) – Miguel de Cervantes/Don Quijote de la Mancha
 My Fair Lady (2010)
 Tenías que ser tú (2013) – Vito Pignoli
 Pobre Inés sentada ahí'' (2016)

References 

1966 births
Chilean television actors
Chilean film actors
People from Punta Arenas
20th-century Chilean actors
21st-century Chilean actors
Living people
Chilean television personalities